The list of Quebec Water Channels aims to regroup all the artificial watercourses of Quebec and all the water channels constituting the seaway of the St. Lawrence River, in its Quebec part.

Mauricie 
 Mégiscane Canal

Outaouais 
 Carillon Canal

Montérégie 
 Chambly Canal
 Saint-Ours Canal

Montreal region 
 Aqueduct Canal
 Sainte-Anne-de-Bellevue Canal
 Lachine Canal
 Soulanges Canal

St. Lawrence Seaway 
 St. Lawrence Seaway
 South Shore Canal
 Beauharnois Canal

See also 
 List of rivers of Quebec

Rivers of Quebec
water channels